Tommy Hayes may refer to:

 Tommy Hayes (rugby union, born 1973), Cook Island international rugby union player
 Tommy Hayes (rugby union, born 1980), Irish rugby union player

See also
 Tommy Hays (born 1929), guitarist, band leader and vocalist